Love or Something Like It is the fifth studio album by country music superstar Kenny Rogers, released in 1978. It was Rogers' fourth #1 hit album.

Overview
The album's title cut ("Love or Something Like It") also topped the charts. Though this was the only single to be issued from the album, another cut, "Momma's Waiting" (written by Rogers), was issued on the B-side of a 1978 major hit single, "The Gambler". "Momma's Waiting" was originally recorded by Rogers and The First Edition in 1970.

The song "We Could Have Been The Closest of Friends" was also recorded by a number of other artists including B J Thomas, Sammy Davis Jr. and Tom Jones.

Biographer Chris Bolton notes in the sleevenotes of the 2009 reissue on the Edsel record label that "I Could Be So Good For You", was Kenny's attempt to "go Disco" and suggests the Disco influence may be the reason only one single was pulled from this album. Bolton goes on to call "Momma's Waiting" a close cousin of Merle Haggard's "Mama Tried" and states the album features songs that are much more pop slanted -on the whole- than any of Rogers' previous albums, but the album's best tracks still have an over-riding country sound.

Track listing

Personnel
 Kenny Rogers – guitar, lead vocals
 Billy Sanford, Fred Carter Jr., Jerry Shook, Jimmy Capps, Randy Dorman, Rick Harper – guitars
 Pete Drake – steel guitar
 Hargus "Pig" Robbins, Steve Glassmeyer – keyboards
 Gene Golden, Edgar Struble – ARP synthesizer
 Edgar Struble – clavinet
 Joe Osborn – bass guitar
 Tommy Allsup – six-string bass guitar
 Bob Moore – upright bass
 Jerry Carrigan, Bobby Daniels – drums, percussion
 Bill Joor, Dennis Good, Philip Forrest, Roger Bissell – horns
 Byron Bach, Carl Gorodetzky, Gary Vanosdale, George Binkley, Lennie Haight, Marvin Chantry, Roy Christensen, Samuel Terranova, Sheldon Kurland, Wilfred Lehman – strings
 Bill Justis – string arrangements
 Bobby Daniels, Janie Fricke, Steve Glassmeyer, Gene Golden, The Jordanaires, Wendellyn Suits – backing vocals

Production
 Producer – Larry Butler
 Engineer – Billy Sherrill 
 Recorded at Jack Clement Recording Studios (Nashville, TN).
 Mastered by Bob Sowell at Master Control (Nashville, TN).
 Art Direction and Design – Bill Burks
 Photography – Gary Regester
 Management – Ken Kragen

Charts

Weekly charts

Year-end charts

Certifications

References

1978 albums
Kenny Rogers albums
United Artists Records albums
Albums arranged by Bill Justis
Albums produced by Larry Butler (producer)